Diana Elizabeth Scarwid (born August 27, 1955) is a retired American actress. She is best known for her portrayal of Christina Crawford in Mommie Dearest (1981). She received nominations for the Academy Award for Best Supporting Actress for Inside Moves (1980), and for the Primetime Emmy Award for Outstanding Supporting Actress in a Limited Series or Movie for Truman (1995).

Scarwid has over 70 film and television credits to her name, including Pretty Baby (1978), Rumble Fish, Silkwood (both 1983), Psycho III, Extremities (both 1986), The Neon Bible (1995), What Lies Beneath (2000), Party Monster (2003), The Clearing (2004), and Another Happy Day (2011).

Life and career

Early life
Scarwid was born in Savannah, Georgia, the daughter of Elizabeth (née Frizelle (1920–2006) and Anthony John Scarwid (1911–1989). She has three brothers. Her family are long-time residents of Tybee Island, Georgia. Diana left Georgia at the age of 17, moving to New York to become an actress. She graduated from The American Academy of Dramatic Arts and Pace University simultaneously, completing the dual program as an honor student. After landing bit-parts in TV series, TV movies, and a few motion pictures, she married Eric Scheinbart, a physician, on August 27, 1978, with whom she has two children.

The 1980s
Scarwid's first performance of the 1980s was as Sheila Langtree in Guyana Tragedy: The Story of Jim Jones (1980), the television miniseries about the People's Temple led by Jim Jones and their 1978 mass suicide at Jonestown. Following that was a supporting role in the romantic drama film Honeysuckle Rose (1980). Scarwid landed her breakthrough role in Inside Moves; her performance garnered her an Academy Award nomination for Best Supporting Actress. The following year, she portrayed the adult Christina Crawford, the abused adopted daughter of Hollywood legend Joan Crawford in the 1981 film Mommie Dearest. Her performance earned her a Razzie Award for Worst Supporting Actress.

Scarwid's next roles were in the TV movie Desperate Lives (1982); Strange Invaders; Rumble Fish (1983); Silkwood, the 1983 autobiographical film depicting the turn of events that led to the death of Karen Silkwood; The Ladies Club; Psycho III (1986), the second sequel to Alfred Hitchcock's Psycho and the third movie in the Psycho series; and the 1986 film adaptation of William Mastrosimone's 1982 play Extremities. Other movies included Heat, the TV movie After the Promise (1987), and Brenda Starr, the adventure film based on Dale Messick's comic strip Brenda Starr, Reporter.

The 1990s
Scarwid started off the decade with the role of Willa Harper in Night of the Hunter (1991), the TV remake of the 1955 film; the role was originated by Shelley Winters. Scarwid's next role was the portrayal of Rose Kennedy in JFK: Reckless Youth, a miniseries based on Nigel Hamilton's novel of the same name. In 1995, she played a bigoted and neglectful mother in the comedy-drama movie The Cure; the same year, she starred in The Neon Bible opposite Denis Leary. She portrayed Bess Truman in Truman (1995), an interpretation of David McCullough's Pulitzer Prize-winning book Truman. Scarwid played an alcoholic mother in Gold Diggers: The Secret of Bear Mountain. Some time that year, she and Scheinbart divorced.

In 1996, Scarwid had roles in Trial By Fire, an episode of The Outer Limits;Bastard Out of Carolina, Anjelica Huston's interpretation of Dorothy Allison's novel; the TV movie If These Walls Could Talk; the TV movie Critical Choices; and the TV movie The Angel of Pennsylvania Avenue.

Other highlights included roles in The X-Files in the episode titled "Kitsunegari"; the TV movie Ruby Bridges (1998); the 12-part miniseries From the Earth to the Moon (1998); the miniseries A Will of Their Own (1998); and the TV movie Down Will Come Baby.

The 2000s
Scarwid started the new century with the portrayal of Dianne Barrie in the TV movie Dirty Pictures (2000). The same year, she appeared as Michelle Pfeiffer's character's kooky friend in Robert Zemeckis's What Lies Beneath. In 2001, she guest-starred in Law & Order as a fingerprint analyst accused of manslaughter, and in 2003, she appeared as a prying mother in A Guy Thing. The same year, she portrayed Elke Alig, Michael Alig's enabling and neglectful mother in Party Monster, the adaptation of James St. James's memoir Disco Bloodbath. The following year, she starred as Karen Tyler, a smothering mother in Wonderfalls. She returned to the Law and Order franchise with an appearance as a mother on the warpath after finding out her son is a victim of pedophilia in Law & Order: Special Victims Unit in the episode titled "Head".

In the mid 2000s, she had roles in Read Thread (2005), Valley of the Heart's Delight (2006); and Local Color (2006). The same year, she guest-starred as Jeanette Owens in Prison Break, following which she assumed the role of Isabel, a mysterious sheriff and island inhabitant in the TV series Lost. Consecutively, she assumed roles in episodes of other TV series, including Cold Case, Pushing Daisies, and Heroes. Nearing the end of the decade, she had roles on The Cleaner (2009) and Criminal Minds (2009).

The 2010s
Scarwid appeared in the TV movie Backyard Wedding (2010) and Sam Levinson's Another Happy Day (2011).

Filmography

Film

Television

References

External links
 
 Brief bio at Red Thread 

1955 births
American film actresses
American television actresses
Living people
Pace University alumni
Actresses from Georgia (U.S. state)
Actors from Savannah, Georgia
American Academy of Dramatic Arts alumni
20th-century American actresses
21st-century American actresses
American stage actresses
American Shakespearean actresses